Padua is a city in northern Italy.

Padua may also refer to:

Places
 San Antonio de Padua, Argentina, a city in Greater Buenos Aires
 Province of Padua, Veneto, Italy
 Padua, Illinois, unincorporated community, USA
 Padua, Minnesota, unincorporated community, USA
 Padua, Ohio, unincorporated community, USA
 363 Padua, a main belt asteroid

Schools and universities
 University of Padua, Italy
 Padua College, Brisbane, Australia
 Padua College, Melbourne, Australia
 Padua Franciscan High School, Parma, Ohio, USA
 Padua Academy, Wilmington, Delaware, USA

Other
 Anthony of Padua, Roman Catholic saint
 Padua (ship), a sailing vessel
 Padua, a cultivar of Karuka
 A variation of the color green.
 Padua, Chauddagram Upazila, Comilla District, Bangladesh